Chanwa Ke Take Chakor is Bhojpuri film released in 1981 directed by Nazir Hussain.

See also 
 Bhojpuri Film Industry
 List of Bhojpuri films

References

External links

1981 films
Films directed by Nasir Hussain
1980s Bhojpuri-language films